The Division of Petrie is an Australian Electoral Division in Queensland.

History

The division was created in 1949 and named after Andrew Petrie (1798–1872), a noted civil engineer, pioneer, and explorer, and the first free settler in Brisbane (1837).

The electorate has a higher-than-average percentage of pensioners and self-funded retirees, and is mainly residential, with some light industrial and commercial activities.

Originally a safe Liberal seat, it has become much more marginal since the late 1970s. From 1975–2022, it was held by the party of government for all but one term. 

Ahead of the 2016 federal election, ABC psephologist Antony Green listed the seat in his election guide as one of eleven which he classed as "bellwether" electorates.

In the 2022 federal election, Luke Howarth retained the seat with 54.4% of the vote, resulting in the seat becoming marginal after the election.

Boundaries
Since 1984, federal electoral division boundaries in Australia have been determined at redistributions by a redistribution committee appointed by the Australian Electoral Commission. Redistributions occur for the boundaries of divisions in a particular state, and they occur every seven years, or sooner if a state's representation entitlement changes or when divisions of a state are malapportioned.

Petrie is located in the northern suburbs of Brisbane, and since a redistribution ahead of the 2010 Federal Election has been centred on the Redcliffe Peninsula.

In the Moreton Bay Region, it includes Clontarf, Kippa-Ring, Margate, Redcliffe, Rothwell, Deception Bay,  Scarborough, Woody Point, North Lakes, Mango Hill, Griffin and part of Burpengary.

In the City of Brisbane, it includes Bald Hills, Bracken Ridge, Carseldine and Fitzgibbon, and parts of Aspley and Bridgeman Downs.

Members

Election results

References

 Division of Petrie (Qld) — Australian Electoral Commission

Electoral divisions of Australia
Constituencies established in 1949
1949 establishments in Australia
Federal politics in Queensland